Novak Djokovic was the two-time defending champion, and successfully defended his title by defeating David Ferrer in the final 7–5, 6–2.

Seeds

Draw

Draw

Play-offs

References

World Tennis Championship
2013 in Emirati tennis
Tennis tournaments in the United Arab Emirates